D. Scott Apel is an American author and media critic. He is famous for his analyses of the work of science fiction author Philip K. Dick and the television series The Prisoner.

Apel hosted a rebroadcast of The Prisoner on San Jose public television station KTEH in the mid-1980s. He compiled a new order of progression for the series' episodes based on extensive analysis, one which is considered by many to be definitive. He likens the series' structure to that of a three-act play. Apel's commentary on the themes of The Prisoner notes the show's possible interpretations from Jungian psychology, Platonic philosophy, and Joseph Campbell's "journey of the hero".

Apel was friends with science fiction author Philip K. Dick. He was editor of The Dream Connection, a book which contained transcripts of an interview Apel held with Dick, as well as a letter written from Dick to Apel. Apel was also interviewed for the documentary film The Gospel According to Philip K. Dick.

Apel has published some works of fiction, and was formerly a movie columnist for the San Jose Mercury News.

Partial bibliography
 Philip K. Dick: The Dream Connection, edited by D. Scott Apel. 2000
 Killer B's: The 237 Best Movies On Video You've (Probably) Never Seen (The Impermanent Press, 1997).
 Silicon Valley Night Beat December 1990, R & E Publishers
 The Films of Philip K. Dick by D. Scott Apel https://web.archive.org/web/20080513113554/http://www.deepleafproductions.com/wilsonlibrary/texts/apel-dick.html
 The Complete works of D. Scott Apel Copyright 1982
 Daughter of the Wind Copyright 1981
 Approaching Science Fiction Writers by D. Scott Apel and Kevin C. Briggs. Copyright 1980
 E Attraction by D. Scott Apel. Illustrations by Yasha Haas. 1977 The Permanent Press.

References

American media critics
American science fiction writers
Year of birth missing (living people)
Living people
Place of birth missing (living people)
Writers from San Jose, California
American male novelists
The Mercury News people
American male non-fiction writers